Sotu is one of six parishes (administrative divisions) in Les Regueres, a municipality within the province and autonomous community of Asturias, in northern Spain.

The population is 138 (INE 2011).

Villages
 Alcéu
 Pereda
 Sotu

References

Parishes in Las Regueras